Events in the year 1572 in Norway.

Incumbents
Monarch: Frederick II

Events
Povel Huitfeldt was appointed Governor-General of Norway.

Arts and literature

Births

Deaths

See also

References